CHRK-FM is a radio station broadcasting from Sydney, Nova Scotia, Canada at 101.9 FM owned by Stingray Group. The station is one of several radio stations approved in 2007 for the Atlantic Provinces. It is also one of two radio stations for the Cape Breton region along with sister station CKCH-FM.

History
The station began a required three week Industry Canada testing period on May 15, 2008, and officially launched on May 27, at 8 a.m., with the first song being "4 Minutes" by Madonna. It was branded 101.9 The Giant until May 21, 2021, when it rebranded as Hot 101.9. The station's format is hot adult contemporary.

CHRK was formerly a call sign for CKRV-FM in Kamloops, British Columbia from 1984 to 1993 and short term call-sign of radio station CJAQ-FM in Calgary, Alberta between 1999 and 2002.

Former Logos

References

External links
 Hot 101.9
 RadioWest November Newsletter
 
 

HRK
HRK
HRK
Radio stations established in 2008
2008 establishments in Nova Scotia